Upton is a village in Wirral, Merseyside, England.  It contains five buildings that are recorded in the National Heritage List for England as designated listed buildings, all of which are listed at Grade II.  This grade is the lowest of the three gradings given to listed buildings and is applied to "buildings of national importance and special interest".  Originally a village, Upton has become absorbed by the growth of Birkenhead, of which it is now effectively a suburb.  The listed buildings are a church and two large houses, both of which have been adapted to serve other purposes.

References

Citations

Sources

Listed buildings in Merseyside
Lists of listed buildings in Merseyside